Ramesuan or Rammesuan (Old , ; Modern , ;  Rāmēśvara; "Lord Rāma") was a Thai royal title given to crown princes of the Ayutthaya Kingdom. It may refer to:

 Ramesuan (king of Ayutthaya), reigned twice in 1369–1370 and 1388–1395, a son of King Ramathibodi I
 Ramrachathirat, reigned 1395–1409, a son of King Ramesuan
 Borommatrailokkanat, reigned 1448–1488, a son of King Intharacha
 Ramesuan (prince of Ayutthaya), a son of King Maha Chakkraphat, captured and taken to Burma in the War of the White Elephants (1563–64)
 Ekathotsarot, reigned 1605–1620, a son of King Mahathammarachathirat

Thai royal titles